Rune Factory: Tides of Destiny, known in Japan and PAL regions as , is a Wii and PlayStation 3 role-playing game in the Rune Factory series, developed by Neverland. It is published by Marvelous Entertainment in Japan, Natsume in North America, and Rising Star Games in Europe and Australia. 

Players control a male and female character in one, the male side named Aden and the female side named Sonja, as they traverse the seas on a giant beast named Ymir. The beast can raise sunken islands and ships from the sea. Players are able to farm, fight using a real-time battle system, and form relationships. The game was released on February 24, 2011 in Japan, October 7 in North America, May 25, 2012 in Europe (PlayStation 3 only), and June 13, 2012 in Australia (PlayStation 3 only).

The PlayStation 3 version of the game supports the PlayStation Move motion controller and is the first instance of a Rune Factory title appearing on a Sony home system. North America publisher Natsume picked up the localization rights to the game. The game was set to be released on September 27, 2011, but was pushed back to October 7.

Characters
The two main characters are Aden and Sonja, and the player will be encountering many people such as Lily, Odette, Violet, Bismark, James, Joe and many more. Every character has personalities and stories to them, the more the player gets closer to a character the more they learn about them. The player becomes closer to a character by raising their friendship levels, they can do so by giving them items that they like, talking to them everyday and fulfilling quests for them from the Bulletin board. Raising friendship levels is a key requirement in completing parts of the game's story.

Reception

The Wii version received "generally favorable reviews", while the PlayStation 3 version received "mixed" reviews, according to the review aggregation website Metacritic. Nintendo Power praised the Wii version, noting its graphics, voice acting, and "compelling" plot. In Japan, Famitsu gave the game a score of three eights and one seven for a total of 31 out of 40.

References

External links
 
 Rune Factory: Tides of Destiny at Natsume.com
 Official site 

Role-playing video games
Action role-playing video games
Marvelous Entertainment
Neverland (company) games
PlayStation 3 games
PlayStation Move-compatible games
Rune Factory
Video games developed in Japan
Video games featuring female protagonists
Wii games
2011 video games
Rising Star Games games
Single-player video games
Natsume (company) games